Marina Toybina (born October 15, 1981) is an American costume and fashion designer. She has won six Emmy Awards, including four consecutive in the Outstanding Costumes for a Variety Program or a Special category from 2012 to 2015.

Early life and education
Marina Toybina was born in Moscow, Russia. At age 11, she immigrated to Phoenix, Arizona, and graduated from Shadow Mountain High School in May 2000. Toybina said she designed her first piece of clothing, a purple dress, as a junior and worked at a Hallmark store to save money. She then attended the Fashion Institute of Design & Merchandising (FIDM) in Los Angeles for Fashion Design. In March 2001, Toybina's first fashion show took place at her old high school in which she designed prom dresses for students to wear.

Career
While working at a clothing store, Toybina met fellow FIDM student and colleague Ashton Hirota. In 2002, they launched a fashion line, Glaza, which means "eyes" in Russian. Later that year, they put on their first fashion show which featured nearly 200 pieces. Toybina said they focused on "the creative spirit" rather than celebrity red carpet fashion. Notable clients included Mary J. Blige and members of the Black Eyed Peas. By 2004, Toybina said she had "sold most of [her] furniture and pretty much lost [her] apartment" but remained committed to fashion design.

In March 2005, Toybina became the sole owner of Glaza and relaunched the label in July 2006 with a new fashion show. In late 2007, she received more recognition after one of the pieces was worn by Britney Spears in her "Piece of Me" music video. According to Billboard, Toybina has been "booked solid" since 2010. She has designed outfits worn in the tours and music videos of Taylor Swift, Usher, Ariana Grande, Katy Perry, Nicki Minaj, Pink, Carrie Underwood, and Fifth Harmony, among others. Toybina also created the backup dancers' costumes in the 2015 Super Bowl XLIX halftime show. She began work on television series with The X Factor and has also done so on So You Think You Can Dance, World of Dance, and The Masked Singer.

Awards and nominations

References

Living people
American fashion designers
People from Phoenix, Arizona
Russian emigrants to the United States
1981 births